Sur Sports Club is an Omani sports club based in Sur. The club is currently playing in the Oman Professional League, top division of Oman Football Association. Their home stadium is Sur Sports Complex. The stadium is government owned, but they also own their own personal stadium and sports equipments, as well as their own training facilities.

Being a multisport club
Although being mainly known for their football, Sur SC like many other clubs in Oman, have not only football in their list, but also hockey, volleyball, handball, basketball, badminton and squash. They also have a youth football team competing in the Omani Youth league.

Colors, kit providers and sponsorships
Sur SC have been known since establishment to wear a full blue or white (Away) kit (usually a darker shade of blue), varying themselves from neighbors Al-Oruba SC (white) and Al-Tali'aa SC (orange) kits. They have also had many different sponsorships over the years. As of now, Adidas provides them with kits.

Notable coaches
   Eddie Firmani (1992–93)
  Ashraf Kasem (2013)
  Petre Gigiu (2014)
  Velizar Popov (2013-2014 / 2018- )

Achievements
Omani League (2):
Winners: 1994–95, 1995–96
Runners-up: 1996–97, 1997–98, 2001–02

Sultan Qaboos Cup (4):
Winners: 1973, 1992, 2007, 2019
Runners-up: 2006, 2014–15

Omani Federation Cup (0):
Winners: 
Runners-up: 2007

Oman Super Cup (0):
Winners: 
Runners-up: 2008, 2019

Oman First Division League (1):
Winners: 2010–11
Runners-up:

Club performance-International Competitions

AFC competitions
Asian Club Championship : 1 appearance
1997–98 : First Round
AFC Cup : 1 appearance
2008 : Group Stage
2020 : Play-off round

UAFA competitions
Gulf Club Champions Cup: 1 appearance
2009–10 : Group Stage

Continental record

Players
As of 28 January 2020

First team squad

Personnel

Current technical staff

Management

References

External links
Sur SC at Soccerway
Sur SC at Goalzz.com

Football clubs in Oman
Oman Professional League
Sur, Oman
Association football clubs established in 1969
1969 establishments in Oman